James Preston Delgado (born January 11, 1958) is a maritime archaeologist, historian, maritime preservation expert, author, television host, and explorer.

Delgado is a maritime archaeologist who has spent over four decades in underwater exploration.

Delgado's career has included heading a major maritime museum, leading both the National Park Service and National Oceanic and Atmospheric Administration (NOAA)’s maritime heritage programs, giving numerous academic and public presentations, teaching at several universities, and sharing his expertise in hundreds of televisions documentaries as well as answering global media calls on shipwreck-related stories. He also pioneered the standards and guidelines for the U.S. government's National Park Service's National Historic Landmark Studies to preserve maritime shipwrecks and cultural land sites as designated, protected areas. In addition, he is the author of over 200 academic articles, and more than 33 books. He also edited the first encyclopaedia of underwater and maritime archaeology. Named a Fellow of the Explorers Club in 1997, Delgado is also a Fellow of the Royal Geographical Society, the Royal Canadian Geographical Society, and an Officer in Spain's Order of Civil Merit.

Early life

Archaeology made a lasting impression on Delgado from age 10, inspired by his teachers’ lessons on ancient Egypt, Greece and Rome. When he was fourteen, he became fascinated with a construction site near his home in the Santa Teresa foothills that revealed the remains of the Ohlone people who had lived in the region thousands of years before. The site later became the hacienda and headquarters of an 1835 Mexican landgrant, the Rancho de Santa Teresa, homestead of the pioneer Bernal family. In a time before historic preservation laws were enacted, the site, later designated as CA-SCL-57 (and later renumbered as CA-SCL-125) was being bulldozed and looted while a handful of archaeologists worked on the periphery outside of the construction zone. Delgado, initially as a lone volunteer, worked in the construction zone, mapping, photographing and recovering artifacts and excavating and recovering construction-damaged burials. He continued periodic work at the site through High School and returned to assist in a 1980 excavation of one of the last undisturbed areas of the site in advance of continued construction. The destruction of the site had a profound effect on Delgado. At 16, he prepared the nomination papers for the site, as the "Rancho de Santa Teresa Hacienda and Headquarters." It was listed on the National Register in 1975 as site #75002184. His research notes, photographs, and materials are now in the special collections of the San Jose Public Library. They also document his earliest, teenage exploration s into the nearby foothills in search of caves, abandoned mines, archaeological sites, and historic ruins.

Delgado, at 14, made an appointment with then San Jose Mayor Norman Y. Mineta to lobby for changes in the city's laws to protect archaeological sites. Mineta appointed Delgado to be the San Jose Youth Commission's Liaison to the city's Historical landmarks Commission. After serving as the liaison for three years, then Mayor Janet Gray Hayes appointed Delgado as a commissioner in 1976 when he was 18. Hayes also appointed Delgado to the San Jose Bicentennial Commission, which planned and organized the city's events in celebration of the American Revolution Bicentennial in 1976. As a commissioner, he participated in the first inventory of historical and architectural heritage in 1977, and then the Santa Clara County Heritage Inventory.

Delgado's early experience in historic preservation, especially the National Register nomination, opened his eyes to the larger world of historic preservation beyond archaeology, while also solidly affirming what would become a lifelong quest to protect the past from looting and destruction. 
Encouraged by his father, Delgado also focused on public speaking, debate club, student government, and competed in public speaking contests. He won the local Optimist's Club's speaking competition in 1973 for a speech on the club's theme for that year, "Listen World." The following year, he won the historical narration contest of the local chapter of the Native Sons of the Golden West.

At age 14, he also landed his first job as a fifty cent per hour assistant at the New Almaden Museum south of San Francisco, sweeping floors and washing windows. He spent many hours eagerly studying artifacts housed in the glass cases, and eventually graduated to tour guide. His mentor, museum founder Constance B. "Connie" Perham, taught him, as he would later write, “that collecting the past meant nothing unless you could share it with others and make it relevant and exciting for them."

During his high school years, with permission from site supervisors, he would dig and survey local construction site areas, working side-by-side with Bay Area archaeologists like Chester and Linda King and Rob Edwards, who served as mentors. He also began conferring with graduate students of an archaeology class from San Jose State University, where he would eventually enroll as a history major thanks to the mentorship of Dr. Theodore "Ted" C. Hinckley of the History Department, who convinced Delgado's parents to send him to University and not the local community college. In his sophomore year, he shifted to San Francisco State University as a cooperative education student working with the National Park Service (NPS). He graduated with a B.A. in American history, and would later teach at this and three other universities.

Career

Delgado's career has spanned four decades, focused on history, archaeology, with an emphasis on maritime and naval subjects. During his career, he worked while earning his various degrees, starting with his graduation from High School, and subsequently earning his BA, MA and PhD while working.  He began working professionally at a young age, working part-time in museums and as an archaeological field survey technician while in Junior High and High School, before joining the National Park Service as a historian.

1972–1976: Part-time museum curator at the New Almaden Museum (San Jose, California) and archaeological field surveyor
1976–1978: Part-time historic home curator at the Roberto-Sunol Adobe and the Winchester Mystery House (San Jose, California) and office assistant in the History Department at San Jose State University
1978–1991: Assistant Regional Historian, Park Historian for the Golden Gate National Recreation Area, and Maritime Historian of the National Park Service (San Francisco, California and Washington, D.C.)
1991-2006: Executive Director, Vancouver Maritime Museum and Host, The Sea Hunters
2006–2010: Executive Director and President, Institute of Nautical Archaeology
2010–2017: Director of Maritime Heritage, NOAA's Office of National Marine Sanctuaries
2017–Present: Senior Vice President, SEARCH, Inc.

Historian

Delgado first served for a year as the assistant to NPS Western Regional Historian Gordon S. Chappell, where he completed a series of National Register of Historic Places nominations for sites as diverse as U.S. Highway 1 on the Northern California coast, and the historic ships at San Francisco's Hyde Street Pier. Delgado remained with the NPS as the first Park Historian for Golden Gate National Recreation Area (GGNRA) serving from 1979 to 1986. The park covered 35,000 acres containing more than 2,000 historic buildings and sites such as Alcatraz, and a number of military forts and gun batteries, including a forgotten Civil War fortification at Fort Mason, the Black Point Battery. He co-directed the archaeological excavation of the battery with Martin T. Mayer. He also led the park's early efforts to survey, characterize, and restore elements of the Adolph Sutro Historic District, which included Sutro heights, the grounds of the estate of Adolph Joseph Heinrich Sutro, developer of much of San Francisco's "Outside Lands," and onetime Mayor, as well as Sutro's Cliff House, San Francisco and the ruins of the Sutro Baths. All of this was part of the relatively new park's initial assessment of cultural resources within its boundaries and determining what was significant. As the first historian for the park, he, along with the park's first archaeologist, Martin T. Mayer, and its first historic architect, J. Patrick Christopher, completed the initial inventory and the first cultural resources management plan for the Golden Gate National Recreation Area.

His destiny might have been as a land-focused historian and archaeologist if he were not transfixed by the sight of the gold rush-era ship Niantic's unearthed timbers in San Francisco's Financial District when he was 20. Delgado worked with archaeologist Dr. Allen Pastron[1] on several excavations beginning in 1979. Among the buried ships from 1849 to 1851 that he would help excavate or analyze are the storeships Niantic and General Harrison, the ships William Gray and Candace, and many more.

He also learned to scuba dive during his NPS tenure and worked closely with the Park Service's Submerged Cultural Resources Unit after the NPS sent him to the Presidio of San Francisco to attend an Army dive class. He was the principal author of the final National Park Service study on the Bikini Atoll wrecks. Those shipwrecks include the aircraft carrier USS Saratoga, Japanese battleship Nagato, the battleship USS Arkansas, the destroyer USS Lamson, the attack transport USS Gilliam, the attack transport USS Carlisle, and the submarines USS Pilotfish and USS Apogon.

In addition to his work in the water, a key aspect of Delgado's early work was documenting the remains and environmental conditions surrounding shipwrecks exposed as a result of beach erosion. He was one of the first archaeologists in the United States to conduct such studies, beginning with the wrecks of the schooner Neptune, and the Golden Gate National Recreation Area, the steamer Pomo at Point Reyes National Seashore, and in 1985, he led a detailed survey of beached shipwreck remains at Cape Hatteras and Cape Lookout National Seashores in North Carolina. His Master's Thesis was based on his work with the beached wreck of the Gold Rush steamer Tennessee, which lies within the boundaries of the Golden Gate National Recreation Area in Tennessee Cove.

After a one-year sabbatical from the NPS in 1984-1985 to attend East Carolina University, Delgado gained a master's degree in Maritime History and Underwater Research and was subsequently assigned by NPS Chief Historian Edwin C. Bearss to work as project historian on the USS Monitor project with the National Oceanic and Atmospheric Administration(NOAA). That work led to a series of historical and archaeological context studies, and Delgado personally completed the successful nomination for Monitor's designation as one of the first National Historic Landmark shipwrecks in the United States. He subsequently completed the National Historic Landmark studies for the wrecks of USS Arizona and USS Utah at Pearl Harbor. As of 2018, there are only nine National Historic Landmark shipwrecks or hulks that have been designated by the Secretary of the Interior.

Maritime preservation

In 1987, Delgado became the first Maritime Historian of the National Park Service and as such, the founding chief of the NPS maritime preservation program, the National Maritime Initiative (NMI). The NMI at that time functioned as the maritime preservation program for the entire federal government. The Initiative is now known as the NPS Maritime Heritage Program In this role, Delgado oversaw the creation of classification standards and guidelines for preservation and documentation. Delgado was the principal author of the National Register of Historic Places’ guidelines for nominating historic ships and shipwrecks and co-authored the National Register Bulletin for nominating historic aids to navigation.

As a guiding principle of the National Maritime Initiative, Delgado, based on his experience at Golden Gate National Recreation Area, insisted on a physical inspection of the nation's large historic vessels as part of the creation of a comprehensive national inventory of those vessels. That meant extensive travel throughout the United States, visiting ships, sailing, steaming and motoring on them, inspecting them during shipyard haulouts and repairs, climbing masts, crawling through engine rooms, and not just conducting a desk-top survey from afar. The first inventory of the large historic ships in the United States, led by Delgado, was completed and published in 1990 in conjunction with J. Candace Clifford. It remains the basis for the National Park Service's ongoing, now digital inventory.

Working from the inventory, Delgado applied the criterion of the National Register of Historic Places and the National Historic Landmarks Program to determine which of some 330 large historic vessels were of national significance. He led the resulting effort, which studied study 142 ships for designation as national landmarks. He personally prepared the studies for 54 properties, including several lightships, fireboats, tugboats, submarines, and other warships. Delgado's work led to the largest group of maritime resources being designated as National Historic Landmarks since the creation of the NHL Program. Among the ships and sites he personally studied and nominated are the schooner Adventuress, USS Albacore, the fireboat Firefighter, the schooner Governor Stone, the U.S. Navy tug USS Hoga, the aircraft carriers USS Lexington and USS Hornet, schooner American Eagle, the tugboat Arthur Foss, the fireboat Duwamish, the destroyer USS Edson, the Victory Ship Lane Victory, the Ambrose Lightship, the river steamboat Nenana, the four-masted ship Falls of Clyde, the schooner Bowdoin, the bark Elissa the nuclear ship Savannah, and the excursion steamer Virginia V. Delgado also conducted the NHL study for Lowell's Boat Shop in Amesbury, Massachusetts, as well as the home of former First Lady Lou Henry Hoover at Stanford University.

As part of his duties, and with his degree in maritime archaeology, Delgado closely interacted with the National Park Service's Submerged Cultural Resources Center as well as the Chief Archaeologist of the NPS during his tenure with the National Maritime Initiative. This included co-authoring the guidelines for the implementation of the Abandoned Shipwreck Act of 1987 following a series of national public meetings, several of which Delgado personally led.

Delgado also joined the SCRU in their fieldwork in various parks, including his former assignment, Golden Gate National Recreation Area, Cape Cod National Seashore, Fort Jefferson National Monument (now a National Park, the USS Arizona Memorial, and outside the park system, notably at Bikini Atoll in the Pacific. Delgado spent his final field season with NPS in 1990, working again at Bikini, and then leading a team to Mexico to jointly study the remains of the 1846 USS Somers, the setting for the navy's only mutiny and the inspiration for Herman Melville's Billy Budd.[12] One of his final assignments was co-authoring the first submerged cultural resources assessment for the region where he first worked, the Golden Gate National Recreation Area, Point Reyes National Seashore, and the Gulf of the Farallones National Marine Sanctuary.

In 1991, he moved to Vancouver, British Columbia where he took on the role of Executive Director of the Vancouver Maritime Museum for the next 15 years. His work included organizing a $3-million reenactment of the historic Northwest Passage and North America-circumnavigating voyages of the museum's centerpiece exhibit, the Royal Canadian Mounted Police motor schooner, St. Roch. He led the crew that restored Ben Franklin (PX-15), a 130-ton oceanographic research submersible originally built in Switzerland for famed undersea explorer and scientist Jacques Piccard and most famously used on a historic 30-day "drift mission" along the eastern seaboard of the United States in 1969. He spearheaded a major initiative to relocate the museum from its original, crowded and outdated facilities and to create a National Maritime Center for Canada from 2004 to 2006, but despite gaining federal and provincial support, the effort faltered when the City of Vancouver, despite initial encouragement, ultimately decided not to support moving the museum. His final project at the museum, an illustrated maritime history of Vancouver, Waterfront, won the City of Vancouver Book Award and a British Columbia BC Book Award in 2006.

Maritime archaeology

While at the Vancouver Maritime Museum, Delgado returned to university to obtain his Ph.D. in archaeology, receiving the degree in 2006 from Simon Fraser University. Following his graduation, he was named an Adjunct Member of the Faculty of the Department of Archaeology. From 2001 to 2006, he hosted and was the team archaeologist on, the popular Canadian-made National Geographic international documentary series, which drew an audience of over 200 million people in over 172 countries for its six seasons. He worked with famous novelist, raconteur and shipwreck hunter Clive Cussler, the series presenter, master divers Mike and Warren Fletcher, and John Davis from Eco-Nova Productions.

In 2006, he remained in Vancouver but joined the Institute of Nautical Archaeology (INA) as its Executive Director. In April 2008, he was elected President and CEO of this worldwide nautical archaeology organization. Among his achievements were a new strategic plan, a new website and publications, new partnerships, and several international projects undertaken by INA scholars. Among those was the excavation of a Phoenician wreck in Spain, the study of a riverine naval battle of 1288 in Vietnam, the excavation of Byzantine wrecks in Istanbul, and the study of abandoned and wrecked river steamers in Canada's Yukon. During this period, Delgado continued his own archaeological work, the documentation of a U.S. Civil War-era submersible, Sub Marine Explorer.

In October 2010, he left INA to become the Director of Maritime Heritage in the Office of National Marine Sanctuaries for the National Oceanic & Atmospheric Administration in Washington, D.C. He coordinated and at times supervised all maritime heritage activities in the 14 units in the NMS system, and provided maritime heritage support to all other parts of NOAA.

During his years with NOAA, he was involved in the Titanic mapping expedition in 2010 as chief scientist, continued his years of study on the Civil War-era, pearl-diving submersible Sub Marine Explorer, participated in field work while reorganizing and focusing the maritime heritage program, and mentored five high school students from Saginaw, Michigan, for Project Shiphunt.

He led the excavation of the Civil War-era blockade running steamer Mary Celestia in Bermuda, and either led or co-led maritime heritage expeditions in the Alaskan Arctic, in the waters of Greater Farallones National Marine Sanctuary, where the wrecks of SS City of Rio de Janeiro, SS City of Chester, SS Ituna, SS Selja, and USS Conestoga, among others, were discovered, a survey of coastal communities and the maritime cultural landscape north of San Francisco, the sonar survey of the wreck of USS Hatteras, and deep water submersible expeditions off Hawaii that led to the discovery of the Japanese super-submarine I-400 and the former cable-laying ship USS Kailua, ex-SS Dickensen. Delgado worked closely with NOAA's Office of Ocean Exploration, and in a series of telepresence-enabled missions that relied on remotely operated vehicles linked to shore-based exploration and command centers and the public through the Internet. He also worked with and continues to work with Dr, Robert Ballard's Ocean Exploration Trust on telepresence missions. These have included the first telepresence-assisted maritime archaeological excavation in deep water, with an early 19th-century shipwreck in the Gulf of Mexico in 2013, the archaeological reconnaissance of the wrecks of the SS Coast Trader and SS Dorothy Wintermote, and the first archaeological documentation of the wrecks of USS Independence and USS Bugara.

Delgado created a NOAA maritime heritage publication series, instituted the use of maritime cultural landscapes as a principle for characterizing and managing maritime cultural resources in the National Marine Sanctuary System, and led NOAA's ongoing role in the U.S. Government's activities related to the wreck of Titanic. He also was key in the successful negotiation and signing of international agreements between the United States, the Kingdom of Spain, and the Republic of France on shared underwater and maritime cultural heritage, and represented the United States in international meetings with the United Nationals Educational and Cultural Organization (UNESCO). Delgado also co-chaired the interagency working group on underwater cultural heritage in Washington, D.C. during his NOAA tenure.

SEARCH, Inc.

In 2017, as he approached 60, Dr. Delgado retired from government service and joined the private sector as Senior Vice President of SEARCH, Inc., one of the largest cultural resources and archaeological firms in the United States. Since then he has worked on a variety of projects, most recently the analysis of a wreck thought to be Clotilda, the last American ship to bring slaves to the United States. The analysis by Dr. Delgado and his colleagues determined the wreck was not Clotilda. Dr. Delgado led a subsequent project which analyzed over a dozen possible targets that culminated in a year-long excavation and analysis that identified one of the targets as Clotilda. The results were revealed by the Alabama Historical Commission in May 2019. Dr. Delgado's other projects at SEARCH have included other maritime projects, notably serving as the Series Senior Advisor for the ongoing National Geographic Television Series Drain the Oceans, in which he also frequently appears. In May 2020, Dr. Delgado was the lead archaeologist in the search for, discovery, and exploration of the battleship , discovered by Ocean Infinity and SEARCH, Inc. in three miles of water off Oahu.

Recognition, public and professional service

In addition to 20 years of public service in the National Park Service and the National Oceanic and Atmospheric Administration, Delgado has held a series of appointed civic political positions and has served as an officer in professional associations, including a term as President of the Council of American Maritime Museums. He is a Registered Professional Archaeologist (RPA), and is an elected Fellow of the Royal Geographical Society, the Royal Canadian Geographical Society, and The Explorers Club. He is a longstanding member of the Society for Historical Archaeology, the Archaeological Institute of America, and the Society for American Archaeology. He has served on the editorial board for professional journals and is on the editorial advisory board of Archaeology Magazine.

He has been the recipient of a number of professional and public service awards, including special achievement awards for sustained superior performance from the National Park Service, the Department of Commerce Bronze medal, NOAA Administrator's Awards, book awards including the Society for Historical Archaeology's James Deetz Award, the North American Society for Oceanic History's John Lyman Award, Choice's Academic Title of the Year, and was also named Naval History Magazine's Author of the Year. In 2012, he received the Stefansson Medal for Outstanding Contributions to the cause of exploration and/or field sciences in Canada or internationally by exceptionally meritorious Canadian members of the Explorers Club. In 2014, he was named an Officer of the Order of Civil Merit, Knight's Cross by his Majesty Juan Carlos I, King of Spain, for services rendered to Spain for the protection of Spanish underwater cultural heritage while President and CEO of the Institute of Nautical Archaeology in the matter of the wreck of the frigate Nuestra Señora de las Mercedes, 2014.

Education and outreach

Delgado's minor as an undergraduate was journalism. He has applied this emphasis to a number of the articles and books he has written, to connect to the public. He has written for the Vancouver Sun, the Washington Post, the Boston Globe, as well as popular magazines, including Archaeology, American History Illustrated, Naval History, and Wreck Diver. Beginning with his tenure with the National Park Service in San Francisco, he regularly appeared on local, regional, and national news, again emphasizing people stories and common aspects of history that connect communities. He has appeared in documentary films since the 1990s and continues to actively promote archaeology and history on film and on the Internet, including a series of short takes on maritime archaeology and history for CuriosityStream.

He has appeared as a guest speaker at the TED-inspired EG series in Monterey, and at IdeaCity in Toronto ideacity: Archaeology in the Final Frontier: The Ocean, and actively lectures around the world. He is a regular lecturer for the Archaeological Institute of America, lectured onboard small adventure cruise vessels for Lindblad and Zegrahm Expeditions for nearly three decades, and regularly speaks to his favorite audience, school classes ranging from kindergarten to college. One of his favorite activities in this regard was Project Shiphunt.
In his role as Director of NOAA's Maritime Heritage Program, Delgado mentored a group of five Saginaw, Michigan high school students on a shipwreck research expedition in Lake Huron. The mission was sponsored by Sony and the Intel Corp and resulted in a positive, life-changing experience for the students and a documentary film.

Awards
 1999 John Lyman Book Awards
 2011 James L. Deetz Award

Selected bibliography

References

External links
Delgado's Website
Delgado's Professional Bio
Institute of Nautical Archaeology
National Oceanic and Atmospheric Administration, National Marine Sanctuaries
Records of James P. Delgado are held by Simon Fraser University's Special Collections and Rare Books

1958 births
Living people
American archaeologists
21st-century American historians
American underwater divers
American male non-fiction writers
East Carolina University alumni
Simon Fraser University alumni
Underwater archaeologists
Santa Teresa High School alumni
Historians from California